2019 Thai League 3 Lower Region is the 3rd season of the Thai football league. It is a part of the Thai League 3 and the feeder league for the Thai League 2. A total of 14 teams will compete in the league this season.

Changes from last season

Team changes

Promoted clubs

Two clubs were promoted from the 2018 Thai League 4
 Nakhon Pathom United
 North Bangkok University

A clubs were promoted to the 2019 Thai League 2
 MOF Customs United

Relegated clubs

A club was relegated to the 2019 Thai League 4 Bangkok Metropolitan Region
 Deffo

A club was relegated from the 2018 Thai League 2 
 Krabi

Moved clubs

Simork were moved into the Upper Region.

Renamed clubs

WU Nakhon Si United renamed Nakhon Si United

Teams

Stadium and locations

Foreign Players

League table

Positions by round

Results by match played

Results

Season statistics

Top scorers
As of 8 September 2019.

Hat-tricks

Attendance

Overall statistics

Attendance by home match played

Source: Thai League 3 
Note: Some error of T3 official match report 14 July 2019 (Ranong United 1–1 BTU United).

See also
 2019 Thai League 1
 2019 Thai League 2
 2019 Thai League 3
 2019 Thai League 4
 2019 Thai FA Cup
 2019 Thai League Cup
 2019 Thai League 3 Upper Region

References

 Thai League 3 Official Website

External links
Thai League 3 
smmsport.com

Thai League 3
2019 in Thai football leagues